Khorramshahr (also romanized as Khurramshahr, romanized as Al-Muhammerah) is a city and capital of Khorramshahr County, Khuzestan Province, Iran. At the 2016 census, its population was 170,976, in 47,380 households.

The city extends to the right bank of the Shatt Al Arab waterway near its confluence with the Haffar arm of the Karun river. The city was destroyed in the Iran–Iraq War, with the 1986 census recording a population of zero. However, Khorramshahr was rebuilt after the war, and more recent censuses show that the population has returned to its approximate pre-war level.

History
The area where the city exists today was originally under the waters of the Persian Gulf. It later became part of the vast marshlands and the tidal flats at the mouth of the Karun River. The small town known as Piyan, and later Bayan appeared in the area no sooner than the late Parthian time in the first century AD. Whether or not this was located at the same spot where Khurramshahr is today, is highly debatable.

During the Islamic centuries, the Daylamite Buwayhid king, Panah Khusraw Adud ad-Dawlah ordered the digging of a canal to join the Karun River (which at the time emptied independently into the Persian Gulf through the Bahmanshir channel) to the Shatt al-Arab (the joint estuary of the Tigris and Euphrates rivers, known in Iran as Arvand Rud). The extra water made the joint estuary more reliably navigable. The channel thus created was known as the Haffar, Arabic for "excavated," "dugout," which exactly described what the channel was. The Haffar soon became the main channel of the Karun, as it is in the present day.

Until 1847, at which time it became Persian territory (according to Article II of the Treaty of Erzurum), Khorramshahr was alternately claimed and occupied by Persia and Turkey. Its ruler at the time was an Arab sheikh.

Iran–Iraq War

Because of the war, the population of Khorramshahr dropped from 146,706 in the 1976 census to 0 in the 1986 census. The population reached 34,750 in the 1991 census and by the 2006 census it reached 123,866, and according to World Gazetteer its population as of 2012 is 138,398, making the population close to what it was before the war.

Mandaean community
Khorramshahr is home to a Mandaean community. It is one of the last remaining locations in the world where Neo-Mandaic is still spoken. There are only a few hundred speakers of the Khorramshahr dialect of Neo-Mandaic.

Notable people
 Meguertitch Khan Davidkhanian (b. 1902), former Governor
Majid Bishkar (b. 1956), Iranian football legend, played at the 1978 FIFA World Cup
 Mohsen Rastani (b. 1958), Iranian photographer, photojournalist
 Mohsen chavoshi (b. 1979) is an Iranian musician, singer, record producer and songwriter, based in Tehran. He has released ten albums including a soundtrack to the 2007 film Santouri.

References

External links

 Khorramshahr.net
 Khorramshahr Photo Gallery from the Khuzestan Governorship
 About Spoken Arabic of Khoramshahr
 Khorramshahr Post-War Photo Slideshow
 Liberation of Khorramshahr, Triumph of True Faith

Populated places in Khorramshahr County
Cities in Khuzestan Province
Port cities and towns in Iran
Former ghost towns
Arab settlements in Khuzestan Province